Fritz Buehning (born March 5, 1960) is an American former tennis player.

Born in Summit, New Jersey, Buehning grew up in Millburn, New Jersey and attended Millburn High School, where he won the New Jersey state individual tennis championship in 1977 as a junior, his final year in high school. He attended University of California, Los Angeles, where he was recognized as Pac-10 Player of the Year and an All-American and was part of a tennis team that won the NCAA championship.

Buehning achieved top rankings of No. 21 in singles and No. 4 in doubles, ending his career as a result of a foot injury after five seasons on the tour. On professional tournaments, he won one singles title and 12 doubles titles. Partnered with Van Winitsky, he lost the 1983 US Open finals to the team of Peter Fleming and John McEnroe.

Career finals

Singles: 2 (1 title, 2 runner-ups)

Doubles: 27 (12 titles, 15 runner-ups)

References

External links
 
 

Living people
1960 births
American male tennis players
Millburn High School alumni
People from Millburn, New Jersey
Sportspeople from Summit, New Jersey
Sportspeople from Essex County, New Jersey
Tennis people from New Jersey
UCLA Bruins men's tennis players
Pan American Games medalists in tennis
Pan American Games silver medalists for the United States
Tennis players at the 1979 Pan American Games